The 2017 Under-19 Asia Cup was an international cricket tournament was held in Malaysia from 10 to 19 November 2017. It was originally scheduled to be held in India, but it was moved after the Pakistan Cricket Board (PCB) refused to travel to India.

Teams

Squads

Group stage

Pool A

Points table

Matches

Pool B

Points table

Matches

Knockout stage

Bracket

Semi-finals

Final

Statistics

Most wickets
The top five wicket takers are listed in this table, ranked by wickets taken and then by bowling average.

Most runs
The top five runscorers are included in this table, ranked by runs scored and then by batting average.

Source:

Final standings

References

External links
 Series home at ESPNcricinfo

Asian Cricket Council competitions